Mirco Miori (born 28 August 1995) is an Italian football player who currently plays for ASD Adrense.

Career

Club career
He made his Serie C debut for Südtirol on 7 March 2015 in a game against Real Vicenza.

In February 2020, Miori joined Swiss club FC Emmenbrücke.

References

External links
 
 

1995 births
People from Romano di Lombardia
Living people
Italian footballers
Italian expatriate footballers
F.C. Südtirol players
Piacenza Calcio 1919 players
Alma Juventus Fano 1906 players
U.S. Triestina Calcio 1918 players
Serie C players
Serie D players
Association football goalkeepers
Italian expatriate sportspeople in Switzerland
Expatriate footballers in Switzerland
Sportspeople from the Province of Bergamo
Footballers from Lombardy